Silver fire may refer to: 

 Silver Fire (1987 Oregon wildfire), in the Siskiyou National Forest
 Silver Fire, an August 2013 wildfire in southern California near Banning and Cabazon
 Silver Fire, a 2013 forest fire in southwest New Mexico in the vicinity of Silver City
 Silver Fire (Forgotten Realms), an ability in Dungeons & Dragons
 "Silver Fire", a science fiction story by Greg Egan